General elections were held in Chile on 11 December 1993 to elect the President, members of the Chamber of Deputies and elected members of the Senate. Eduardo Frei Ruiz-Tagle of the Concertación alliance was elected President, and the alliance also won a majority of seats in the Chamber of Deputies and maintained its majority in the Senate.

Results

President

Senate

Chamber of Deputies

References

Elections in Chile
1993 in Chile
Chile
Presidential elections in Chile
December 1993 events in South America
Presidency of Patricio Aylwin